Neb Duric (born 1955) is a Serbian-born American astrophysicist. He received his PhD in astrophysics in 1984 from the University of Toronto, where he earned the Royal Astronomical Society of Canada Gold Medal for academic excellence. After a postdoc at University of British Columbia he moved to University of New Mexico, Albuquerque, where he stayed for many years as a professor of physics and astronomy.   He is a member of American Astronomical Society and Canadian Astronomical Society. He has co-authored over 100 scientific papers. He wrote a textbook "Advanced Astrophysics" published by Cambridge University Press in 2003.

In 2004 he left astrophysics to become a professor at Department of Oncology, 
Wayne State University. He is also Imaging Program Leader at
Karmanos Cancer Institute and Chief Technology Officer for Delphinus Medical Technologies.

References

1955 births
Living people
American chief technology officers
American astrophysicists